William, Will, or Bill Robinson may refer to:

Academics
 William Robinson (fl. 1670), founder of the Robinson's School in Penrith, Cumbria
 William Robinson (benefactor) (1794-1864), American school founder
 William Callyhan Robinson (1834–1911), American law professor at Yale
 William I. Robinson (born 1959), professor of sociology at the University of California, Santa Barbara
 William P. Robinson (born 1949), American educator, former president of Whitworth University
 William S. Robinson (1913–1996), American statistician who defined the ecological fallacy
 Bill Robinson (scientist) (1938–2011), New Zealand scientist, inventor of the lead rubber bearing
 W. C. Robinson (educator) (William Claiborne Robinson, 1861–1914), mathematics professor and president of Louisiana Tech University

Entertainment
 William Robinson (painter, born 1799) (1799–1839), English portrait-painter
 W. Heath Robinson (1872–1944), British cartoonist and illustrator
 Bill Robinson (1878–1949), American tap dancer known as Mr. Bojangles
 W. C. Robinson (1884–1942), actor known as William Robinson
 Bill Robinson (author) (1918–2007), American nautical author
 Willie Robinson (1926–2007), American blues singer
 Bill Robinson (jazz singer) (born 1929), American jazz singer
 Smokey Robinson (born 1940), American R&B and soul singer born William Robinson, Jr.
 Will Robinson (music producer) (born 1967), British music producer
 William Robinson (painter, born 1936) (born 1936), Australian painter and lithographer
 William Ellsworth Robinson (1861–1918), American magician who used the stage name Chung Ling Soo
 Will Robinson, a fictional character in the Lost in Space television and film franchise, recognisable by his companion robot’s catchphrase “Danger, Will Robinson!”

Politics

United States
 William Robinson (Rhode Island official) (1693–1751), deputy governor of the Colony of Rhode Island and Providence Plantations
 William Robinson Jr. (1785–1868), American politician and businessman
 William Erigena Robinson (1814–1892), United States Representative from New York
 William Whipple Robinson (active 1874–1906), Los Angeles City auditor
 William Robinson (Wisconsin politician) (1825–1895), English-born Wisconsin politician
 William F. Robinson (1913–2008), American politician in the Erie County Legislature
 William Edmond Robinson (1920–1992), American politician in Missouri
 William G. Robinson (1926–2011), American politician in Massachusetts
 William P. Robinson Sr. (1911–1981), American politician in Virginia
 William P. Robinson Jr. (1942–2006), American politician in Virginia
 William Russell Robinson (1942–2020), American politician
 Lee Robinson (politician) (William Lee Robinson, born 1943), American politician in Georgia
 Will Robinson (Florida politician), (born 1975), American politician in Florida
 William P. Robinson III (active since 1988), Rhode Island Supreme Court justice
 William M. Robinson, American politician from Mississippi
 William N. Robinson, member of the California State Assembly

United Kingdom
 William Robinson (by 1515-55/58), MP for Worcester
 William Robinson (1534-1616), MP for City of York
 William Robinson (fl. 1559), MP for Bath
 Sir William Robinson, 1st Baronet (1655–1736), English Member of Parliament and Lord Mayor of York
 William Robinson (died 1717) (1668–1717), MP for Denbigh Boroughs in 1705
 William C. F. Robinson (1834–1897), British colonial administrator and musical composer
 William C. Robinson (politician) (1861–1931), British Labour Member of Parliament
 William Edward Robinson (1863–1927), English merchant and Liberal Party politician
 William Albert Robinson (1877–1949), Welsh politician, member of parliament for St Helens
 William Robinson (Walthamstow East MP) (1909–1968), British Labour Party MP, 1966–1968

Other countries
 William Benjamin Robinson (1797–1873), Canadian fur trader and political figure
 William Robinson (runholder) (1814–1889), member of the New Zealand Legislative Council
 William Rose Robinson (1822–1886), Governor of Madras, 1875
 William Robinson (Ontario politician) (1823–1912), Canadian politician in Ontario
 William Robinson (Governor of Hong Kong) (1836–1912), British colonial governor in the Caribbean and Hong Kong
 William Alfred Robinson (Australian politician) (1852–1927), South Australian politician
 William Robinson (Tasmanian politician) (1879–1960), member of the Tasmanian Legislative Council
 William Walsh Robinson (1888–1972), farmer and politician in South Australia
 William Alfred Robinson (1905–1957), Liberal party member of the Canadian House of Commons
 Bill Robinson (Australian politician) (1907–1981), Australian senator
 Ken Robinson (Canadian politician) (William Kenneth Robinson, 1927–1991), member of Canadian parliament from Ontario

Religion
 William Robinson (martyr), Quaker martyr
 William Robinson (priest) (died 1642), Archdeacon of Nottingham
 William Robinson (theologian) (1886–1963), British theologian
 William Robinson (bishop) (1916–2002), Canadian Anglican bishop

Sports

Football and rugby
 William Robinson (American football) (born 1984), American football player
 William S. Robinson (active 1896–1899), American football coach
 Bill Robinson (American football) (1929–2016), American football player
 Bill Robinson (English footballer) (1919–1992), footballer for Sunderland, Charlton Athletic and West Ham United
 Billy Robinson (footballer, born 1925) (1925-1953), English footballer for Stockport County and Accrington Stanley
 Bill Robinson (footballer, born 1880) (1880–1967), Australian rules footballer with Essendon
 William Robinson (footballer, born 1880) (1880–1926), English footballer for Manchester City, Bolton Wanderers and Hull City
 Bill Robinson (footballer, born 1908) (1908–1968), Australian rules footballer with Melbourne
 Bill Robinson (Australian footballer, born 1919) (1919–2007), Australian rules footballer with Hawthorn
 Billy Robinson (Australian footballer) (1890–1969), Australian rules footballer for Carlton
 Billy Robinson (English footballer) (1903–?), English football centre half for Darlington, Southend United and Carlisle United
 Will Robinson (rugby league) (born 1971), Australian rugby league footballer of the 1990s and 2000s
 Bill Robinson (rugby league) (1934–2005), English rugby league footballer of the 1950s and 1960s

Other sports
 Bill Robinson (basketball) (1949–2020), Canadian basketball player
 Bill Robinson (outfielder) (1943–2007), American baseball player and coach
 Bill Robinson (ice hockey) (1921–2008), Canadian ice hockey centreman
 Billy Robinson (1938–2014), British professional wrestler and trainer
 Bobby Robinson (baseball) (William L. Robinson, 1903–2002), American baseball player
 Will Robinson (basketball) (1911–2008), American college basketball coach
 William Robinson (cricketer, born 1847) (1847–1929), New Zealand cricketer
 William Robinson (cricketer, born 1863) (1863–1928), New Zealand cricketer
 William Robinson (swimmer) (1870–1940), British breaststroke swimmer in the 1908 Summer Olympics
 William Robinson (boxer) (born 1936), British Olympic boxer
 Yank Robinson (William H. Robinson, 1859–1894), American baseball player

Others
 William Robinson (architect) (1645–1712), Surveyor General of Ireland from the 1670s until 1700
 Sir William Robinson, 2nd Baronet (1705–1785)
 William Robinson (historian) (1777–1848), solicitor and barrister
 William Robinson (law reporter) (died 1870), law reporter
 William Robinson (murder victim) (died 1868), 1860s murder victim in British Columbia, Canada
 William Stevens Robinson (1818–1876), American journalist
 William D. Robinson (1826–1890), founder of the Brotherhood of Locomotive Engineers during the American Civil War
 William Robinson (banker), Governor of the Bank of England, 1847
 William Robinson (gardener) (1838–1935), Irish-born gardener and journalist
 William Robinson (inventor) (1840–1921), American electrical engineer and inventor of the failsafe track circuit for railroad signaling
 William J. Robinson (1867–1936), American physician, sexologist, and birth control campaigner
 William Sydney Robinson (1876–1963), Australian businessman, industrialist, and diplomat
 Billy Robinson (aviator) (1884–1916), American aviator
 William Leefe Robinson (1895–1918), British aviator
 Bill Robinson (fashion designer) (died 1993), American fashion designer
 Bill Robinson (auto designer) (1925–2022), American automobile designer
 William W. Robinson (1819–1903), Union Army colonel